Pyotr Leonidovich Kapitsa or Peter Kapitza  (Russian: Пётр Леонидович Капица, Romanian: Petre Capița ( – 8 April 1984) was a leading Soviet physicist and Nobel laureate, best known for his work in low-temperature physics.

Biography 
Kapitsa was born in Kronstadt, Russian Empire, to Bessarabian-Volhynian-born parents Leonid Petrovich Kapitsa (Romanian Leonid Petrovici Capița), a military engineer who constructed fortifications, and Olga Ieronimovna Kapitsa from a noble Polish Stebnicki family. Besides Russian, the Kapitsa family also spoke Romanian.

Kapitsa's studies were interrupted by the First World War, in which he served as an ambulance driver for two years on the Polish front. He graduated from the Petrograd Polytechnical Institute in 1918. His wife and two children died in the flu epidemic of 1918–19. He subsequently studied in Britain, working for over ten years with Ernest Rutherford in the Cavendish Laboratory at the University of Cambridge, and founding the influential Kapitza club. He was the first director (1930–34) of the Mond Laboratory in Cambridge.

In the 1920s he originated techniques for creating ultrastrong magnetic fields by injecting high current for brief periods into specially constructed air-core electromagnets. In 1928 he discovered the linear dependence of resistivity on magnetic field strength in various metals for very strong magnetic fields.

In 1934 Kapitsa returned to Russia to visit his parents but the Soviet Union prevented him from travelling back to Great Britain.

As his equipment for high-magnetic field research remained in Cambridge (although later Ernest Rutherford negotiated with the British government the possibility of shipping it to the USSR), he changed the direction of his research to the study of low temperature phenomena, beginning with a critical analysis of the existing methods for achieving low temperatures. In 1934 he developed new and original apparatus (based on the adiabatic principle) for making significant quantities of liquid helium.

Kapitsa formed the Institute for Physical Problems, in part using equipment which the Soviet government bought from the Mond Laboratory in Cambridge (with the assistance of Rutherford, once it was clear that Kapitsa would not be permitted to return).

In Russia, Kapitsa began a series of experiments to study liquid helium, leading to the discovery in 1937 of its superfluidity (not to be confused with superconductivity). He reported the properties of this new state of matter in a series of papers, for which he was later awarded the Nobel Prize in Physics "for basic inventions and discoveries in the area of low-temperature physics".

In 1939 he developed a new method for liquefaction of air with a low-pressure cycle using a special high-efficiency expansion turbine. Consequently, during World War II he was assigned to head the Department of Oxygen Industry attached to the USSR Council of Ministers, where he developed his low-pressure expansion techniques for industrial purposes. He invented high power microwave generators (1950–1955) and discovered a new kind of continuous high pressure plasma discharge with electron temperatures over 1,000,000 K.

In November 1945, Kapitsa quarreled with Lavrentiy Beria, head of the NKVD and in charge of the Soviet atomic bomb project, writing to Joseph Stalin about Beria's ignorance of physics and his arrogance. Stalin backed Kapitsa, telling Beria he had to cooperate with the scientists. Kapitsa refused to meet Beria: "If you want to speak to me, then come to the Institute." Stalin offered to meet Kapitsa, but this never happened.

Immediately after the war, a group of prominent Soviet scientists (including Kapitsa in particular) lobbied the government to create a new technical university, the Moscow Institute of Physics and Technology. Kapitsa taught there for many years. From 1957, he was also a member of the presidium of the Soviet Academy of Sciences and at his death in 1984 was the only presidium member who was not also a member of the Communist Party.

In 1966, Kapitsa was allowed to visit Cambridge to receive the Rutherford Medal and Prize. While dining at his old college, Trinity, he found he did not have the required gown. He asked to borrow one, but a college servant asked him when he last dined at high table, "Thirty-two years" replied Kapitza. Within moments the servant returned, not with any gown, but Kapitsa's own.

In 1978, Kapitsa won the Nobel Prize in Physics "for his basic inventions and discoveries in the area of low-temperature physics" and was also cited for his long term role as a leader in the development of this area. He shared the prize with Arno Allan Penzias and Robert Woodrow Wilson, who won for discovering the cosmic microwave background.

Kapitsa resistance is the thermal resistance (which causes a temperature discontinuity) at the interface between liquid helium and a solid. The Kapitsa–Dirac effect is a quantum mechanical effect consisting of the diffraction of electrons by a standing wave of light. In fluid dynamics, the Kapitza number is a dimensionless number characterizing the flow of thin films of fluid down an incline.

Personal life 
Kapitsa was married in 1927 to Anna Alekseyevna Krylova (1903-1996), daughter of applied mathematician Aleksey Krylov. They had two sons, Sergey and Andrey. Sergey Kapitsa (1928–2012) was a physicist and demographer. He had the nickname "Centaurus". This arose when once Artem Alikhanian asked Kapitsas' student Shalnikov "is your supervisor a human or a beast?" to which Shalnikov responded that he is a Centaurus, i.e. he can be human but also he can get angry and hit you with hooves like a horse. Kapitsa was also the host of the popular and long-running Russian scientific TV show Evident, but Incredible. Andrey Kapitsa (1931–2011) was a geographer. He was credited with the discovery and naming of Lake Vostok, the largest subglacial lake in Antarctica, which lies 4,000 meters below the continent's ice cap.

Kapitsa had the ear of people high up in the Soviet government, due to the usefulness to industry of his discoveries, regularly writing letters on matters of science policy. In particular, he saved both Vladimir Fock and Lev Landau from Stalin's purges of the 1930s, telling Vyacheslav Molotov that Landau was the only one who would be able to solve an important physics puzzle of the time.
 
Kapitsa died on 8 April 1984 in Moscow at the age 89.

Honors and awards 
A minor planet, 3437 Kapitsa, discovered by Soviet astronomer Lyudmila Karachkina in 1982, is named after him. He was elected a Fellow of the Royal Society (FRS) in 1929. In 1958 he was elected a Member of the German Academy of Sciences Leopoldina.

 Hero of Socialist Labour (1945 and 1974)
 Stalin Prize, 1st class (1941 and 1943)
 Nobel Prize in Physics (1978)
 Lomonosov Gold Medal (1959)
 Order of Lenin (1943, 1944, 1945, 1964, 1971)
 Order of the Red Banner of Labour (1954)
 Jubilee Medal "In Commemoration of the 100th Anniversary of the Birth of Vladimir Ilyich Lenin"
 Medal "Veteran of Labour"
 Medal "For the Defence of Moscow"
 Medal "For Valiant Labour in the Great Patriotic War 1941–1945"
 Medal "In Commemoration of the 800th Anniversary of Moscow"
 Order of the Partisan Star (Yugoslavia)

See also 
 Ball lightning
 Basic oxygen steelmaking
 Bipolar battery
 Cliodynamics
 Quantum hydrodynamics
 Reynolds equation
 Kapitza Club
 Kapitza Institute

References

External links 
  including the Nobel Lecture, 8 December 1978 Plasma and the Controlled Thermonuclear Reaction
 
Papers of Piotr Leonidovich Kapitza held at Churchill Archives Centre

1894 births
1984 deaths
People from Kronstadt
People from Petergofsky Uyezd
People from the Russian Empire of Polish descent
People from the Russian Empire of Romanian descent
Inventors from the Russian Empire
Physicists from the Russian Empire
Soviet Nobel laureates
Soviet physicists
University and college founders
Peter the Great St. Petersburg Polytechnic University alumni
Alumni of Trinity College, Cambridge
Fellows of the Royal Society
Academic staff of the Moscow Institute of Physics and Technology
Academic staff of Moscow State University
Full Members of the USSR Academy of Sciences
Members of the German Academy of Sciences Leopoldina
Members of the Royal Irish Academy
Fellows of the American Physical Society
Foreign associates of the National Academy of Sciences
Members of the Serbian Academy of Sciences and Arts
Russian military personnel of World War I
Nobel laureates in Physics
Heroes of Socialist Labour
Stalin Prize winners
Recipients of the Lomonosov Gold Medal
Recipients of the Order of Lenin
Recipients of the Order of the Red Banner of Labour
Niels Bohr International Gold Medal recipients
Superfluidity
Members of the Royal Swedish Academy of Sciences
Foreign members of the Serbian Academy of Sciences and Arts